The Clown is a 2011 Brazilian comedy-drama film. It is the second feature film directed by Selton Mello, who also stars as the protagonist.

The film follows the story of the father and son Benjamin and Valdemar, who work as clowns Pangaré and Puro Sangue, running the country roads together with the Circus Hope troupe. The clown Benjamin, however, is in crisis. He thinks that he is not funny anymore.

The film was selected as the Brazilian entry for the Best Foreign Language Oscar at the 85th Academy Awards.

Plot 
The film tells the story of Benjamin and Valdemar, father and son known as the clowns Pangaré and Puro Sangue. They make their living traveling the country with Circus Hope, without a fixed address, no neighbors, and no ID.

The drama begins when Pangaré, tired of life on the road, feels that he is no longer a funny clown, awakening a lifelong dream of having a place to live and a social security number, proof of residence, and an identity card.

Cast 

 Paulo José as Valdemar / Puro Sangue clown
 Selton Mello as Benjamim / Pangaré clown
 Larissa Manoela as Guilhermina
 Giselle Motta as Lola
 Teuda Bara as Dona Zaira
 Álamo Facó as João Lorota
 Cadu Fávero as Tony Lo Bianco
 Erom Cordeiro as Robson Felix
 Hossen Minussi as Chico Lorota
 Maíra Chasseraux as Lara Lane
 Thogun as Gordini
 Bruna Chiaradia as Justine
 Renato Macedo as Borrachinha
 Tony Tonelada as Meio Quilo
 Fabiana Karla as Tonha
 Jorge Loredo as Nei
 Jackson Antunes as Juca Bigode
 Moacyr Franco as Delegado Justo
 Tonico Pereira as Beto / Deto Papagaio

Production 
The film was shot in March and April 2010; in the city of Paulinia, São Paulo, and some scenes in the district of Conceição do Ibitipoca, Lima Duarte, Minas Gerais.

Director and star of O Palhaço, Selton Mello said in an interview that the film is "a mixture of Oscarito, Didi Mocó and Bye Bye Brazil." He said the production helped him to get rid of depression. Mello showed the script to actors Wagner Moura and Rodrigo Santoro, offering them the lead role, but the schedule prevented  both from accepting the invitation.

Release
The film premiered on October 28, 2011 in 200 theaters throughout Brazil. In the first three days of release the film grossed R$ 2 million, reaching the milestone of 1 million viewers in the third week of screening.

Awards
São Paulo Association of Art Critics Awards
 Won: Best Director - Selton Mello

4th Festival Paulínia de Cinema
 Won: Best Director - Selton Mello
 Won: Best Script - Selton Mello and Marcelo Vindicatto
 Won: Best Supporting Actor - Moacyr Franco
 Won: Best Costume Design - Kika Lopes

See also
 List of submissions to the 85th Academy Awards for Best Foreign Language Film
 List of Brazilian submissions for the Academy Award for Best Foreign Language Film

References

External links
  
 
 

2011 comedy-drama films
2011 films
Brazilian comedy-drama films
Films about clowns
Films directed by Selton Mello
Films shot in Minas Gerais
Films shot in Paulínia
2010s Portuguese-language films